The Santa Clara Broncos women's soccer team represents Santa Clara University in National Collegiate Athletic Association Division I women's soccer. The team competes in the West Coast Conference and is currently coached by Jerry Smith. The Broncos won national championships in 2001 and 2020.

All-Time Coaching Records

Year-by-year statistical leaders

References

External links
 Official website